Aghzaikas is a town in the Federally Administered Tribal Areas of Pakistan. It is located at 32°24'23N 69°28'34E with an altitude of 1800 metres (5908 feet).

References

Populated places in Khyber Pakhtunkhwa